Gillian Bailey (born 14 June 1955 in Wimbledon, London), also known as Gilli Bush-Bailey, is a British academic and former actress.

She was a child actress and appeared as Billie in Here Come the Double Deckers (1970–71). Other roles included Phyllis in a television version of The Railway Children (1968), Janey in The Witch's Daughter (1971), Lavinia in Thursday's Child (1972–73) and Callie in Follyfoot (1971–73).

As an adult actress she was cast in roles such as Jinny Carter in series 1 of Poldark (1975), Ravella in the first episode of Blake's 7  "The Way Back" (1978), Southern TV Live: (1980)‘Together’ Julie Dunn and Maureen Galbraith in the BBC TV series County Hall (1982). In the 1990s she found that work dried up and began working as a script reader.
 
In 1992, she returned to complete her education at Kingston University.

After a period at the Drama and Theatre department at the Royal Holloway, University of London she is now Professor of Women's Performance Histories at the Royal Central School of Speech and Drama in London.

Family 
Bailey married Richard Everett in 1974, and the couple had a daughter, Rebecca.

References

External links

1955 births
Living people
English child actresses
English television actresses
People from Wimbledon, London
Academics of Royal Holloway, University of London
Academics of the Royal Central School of Speech and Drama